The Power of One is the soundtrack to the 1992 film of the same name. The soundtrack was composed by Hans Zimmer. This soundtrack inspired Zimmer to compose Disney's The Lion King in 1994.

Songs 
Performed by Hans Zimmer except as indicated
 "The Rainmaker" – 7:47
 "Mother Africa" – 6:19
 "Of Death & Dying" – 4:12
 "Limpopo River Song" (performed by The Bulawayo Church Choir) – 1:56
 "The Power of One" (performed by Teddy Pendergrass) – 5:17
 "Woza Mfana" – 1:56
 "Southland Concerto" – 2:27
 "Senzenina" – 1:50
 "Penny Whistle Song" – 2:13
 "The Funeral Song" (performed by The Bulawayo Church Choir) – 1:42
 "Wangal' Unozipho" (performed by The Bulawayo Church Choir) – 3:24
 "Mother Africa Reprise" – 8:03

References

Drama film soundtracks
1992 soundtrack albums
Elektra Records soundtracks